Union Town is an EP by The Nightwatchman, alter ego of musician Tom Morello. It is his third release as the Nightwatchman overall, and includes many covers of famous union songs, including "Solidarity Forever" and "Which Side Are You On?". Unlike Morello's previous efforts, the EP was self-produced by Morello himself, and is his first release on the New West Records label.

The EP is the first to feature Carl Restivo, Dave Gibbs and Eric Gardner as part of Morello's backing band, known as The Freedom Fighters Orchestra. All the three of them are also members in Morello's band Street Sweeper Social Club.

Track listing

Personnel
Tom Morello - lead vocals, guitar, harmonica
Carl Restivo - bass, backing vocals
Eric Gardner - drums, percussion, backing vocals
Chris Joyner - piano, keyboards, backing vocals
Ed Roth - organ
Wayne Kramer - backing vocals
Anne Preven - backing vocals
Mary Morello - backing vocals
Rhoads Morello - backing vocals
Diana Molina - backing vocals
Sean Ricigliano - backing vocals
Whitnee Patterson - backing vocals

Production
Produced by Tom Morello
Recorded by Kevin Mills at Veritas Studio, Los Angeles, California
Mixed by Ryan Hewitt at Lock Stock Studio, Los Angeles, CA

External links
 Official Site

References

2011 albums
The Nightwatchman albums